"Sebben, crudele"  is an aria from Antonio Caldara's 1710 opera, La costanza in amor vince l'inganno (Faithfulness in love conquers treachery). It comes from the third scene of the opera's first act, and is sung by the character Aminta, a nobleman whose wife is unfaithful.

Although the opera itself has been rarely performed in modern times, Sebben, crudele remains a popular concert aria. It has been recorded by Cecilia Bartoli, Beniamino Gigli and Janet Baker, amongst others.

Text

Bibliography
Anthology of Italian Song of the Seventeenth and Eighteenth Centuries - Selected and edited with biographical notes by Alessandro Parisotti, G. Schirmer, 1926

References

External links
 The LiederNet Archive

Compositions by Antonio Caldara
Opera excerpts
1710 compositions

{lyrics}

Sebben, crudele,
Mi fai languir,
Sempre fedele
Ti voglio amar.
 

Sebben, crudele,
Mi fai languir,
Sempre fedele
Ti voglio amar.

Sebben, crudele,
Mi fai languir,
Sempre fedele
Ti voglio amar.

Con la lunghezza
Del mio servir
La tua fierezza
La tua fierezza
Saprò stancar.
La tua fierezza
Saprò stancar.

Sebben, crudele,
Mi fai languir,
Sempre fedele
Ti voglio amar.